The 2022 Australian federal election in the Senate was held on 21 May 2022 to elect 40 of the 76 senators in the Australian Senate, after a six-week campaign. Senators elected at this election are scheduled to take office on 1 July 2022, with the exception of the Senators elected from two territories whose terms commence from election day. The elected senators sit alongside continuing senators elected in 2019 as part of the 47th Parliament of Australia.

The Coalition remained the largest parliamentary grouping in the Senate, despite their defeat in the House of Representatives. The Greens won three additional seats in the Senate, thereby gaining the balance of power in the upper house; two senators from every state were Greens as a result of this election. Meanwhile, the incoming Labor government's numbers in the Senate remained unchanged. The six other crossbench seats were 2 One Nation, 2 Jacqui Lambie Network, 1 United Australia Party, and 1 independent (David Pocock).

Australia

New South Wales

Victoria

Queensland

Western Australia

South Australia

Tasmania

Territories

Australian Capital Territory

Northern Territory

References

2022 Australian federal election
Senate 2022
Australian Senate elections